The 1909 Denver Pioneers football team represented the University of Denver as an independent during the 1909 college football season. In their fourth season under head coach John P. Koehler, the Pioneers compiled a 7–2 record, allowed an average of 3.4 points per game, and outscored all opponents by a total of 177 to 31.

Schedule

References

Denver
Denver Pioneers football seasons
Denver Pioneers football